Judge Blackburn may refer to:

Richard Blackburn (1918–1987), judge in Australia before becoming chief justice of the Australian Capital Territory
Robert E. Blackburn (born 1950), judge of the United States District Court for the District of Colorado
Sharon Lovelace Blackburn (born 1950), judge of the United States District Court for the Northern District of Alabama